Santa Monica is a census-designated place (CDP) in Willacy County, Texas, United States. The population was 83 at the 2010 census.

Geography
Santa Monica is located at  (26.365423, -97.590031).

According to the United States Census Bureau in 2000, the CDP has a total area of 0.3 square miles (0.9 km2), all of it land.

Demographics
As of the census of 2000, there were 78 people, 30 households, and 24 families residing in the CDP. The population density was 221.0 people per square mile (86.0/km2). There were 33 housing units at an average density of 93.5/sq mi (36.4/km2). The racial makeup of the CDP was 79.49% White, 19.23% from other races, and 1.28% from two or more races. Hispanic or Latino of any race were 84.62% of the population.

There were 30 households, out of which 33.3% had children under the age of 18 living with them, 60.0% were married couples living together, 20.0% had a female householder with no husband present, and 20.0% were non-families. 20.0% of all households were made up of individuals, and 13.3% had someone living alone who was 65 years of age or older. The average household size was 2.60 and the average family size was 2.96.

In the CDP, the population was spread out, with 24.4% under the age of 18, 6.4% from 18 to 24, 28.2% from 25 to 44, 28.2% from 45 to 64, and 12.8% who were 65 years of age or older. The median age was 36 years. For every 100 females, there were 95.0 males. For every 100 females age 18 and over, there were 78.8 males.

The median income for a household in the CDP was $23,482, and the median income for a family was $24,286. Males had a median income of $48,750 versus $13,750 for females. The per capita income for the CDP was $14,438. There were 30.8% of families and 35.4% of the population living below the poverty line, including 83.3% of under eighteens and none of those over 64.

Education
Santa Monica is served by the Lyford Consolidated Independent School District.

In addition, South Texas Independent School District operates magnet schools that serve the community.

References

External links
 Handbook of Texas Online article

Census-designated places in Willacy County, Texas
Census-designated places in Texas